Clyst Rovers F.C. was a football club based in Clyst Honiton, near Exeter, Devon, England.

History

The club joined the South Western League in 1981 and played there until the 1991–92 season, after which they joined the Western League. They were forced to resign from the league near the end of the 2000–01 season, but successfully re-applied for their spot in Division One the following season. Promotion to the Premier Division was finally achieved following a 4th-place finish in 2003–04, but the club went straight back down after finishing bottom of the table. They remained members of Division One of the Western League until 2007, when they joined the new South West Peninsula League Premier Division. They resigned from the league in 2009–10 and their record was expunged.

In the 1994–95 season, they reached the 1st round of the FA Vase, their best showing among the three years they entered the competition, while they never entered the FA Cup.

Records
FA Vase
First Round 1994–95

References

External links
non-league.org site

Defunct football clubs in Devon
Western Football League
1951 establishments in England
Association football clubs established in 1951
Association football clubs disestablished in 2010
2010 disestablishments in England
Defunct football clubs in England